Bonduiyeh (also Romanized as Bondū’īyeh and Bondūyeh; also known as Bondāreh) is a village in Kuh Mareh Sorkhi Rural District, Arzhan District, Shiraz County, Fars Province, Iran. At the 2006 census, its population was 250, in 59 families.

References 

Populated places in Shiraz County